Long Phearath (born 7 January 1998) is a Cambodian footballer currently playing as a midfielder for Phnom Penh Crown and the Cambodia national team.

References

External links

1998 births
Living people
Cambodian footballers
Cambodia international footballers
Phnom Penh Crown FC players
People from Sihanoukville province
Association football midfielders